Lin Chun-yi (born 2 October 1999) is a badminton player from Taiwan, representing Chinese Taipei.

Career

2023 
In February 2023, Lin reached the final of the 2023 Thailand Masters (badminton) by defeating the former World No. 2 men's singles Chinese player, Shi Yuqi in the semifinals. He defeated the 4th seed and World No. 18 men's singles Hong Kong player Ng Ka Long in the final to win his second BWF World Tour title.

Achievements

BWF World Tour (2 titles) 
The BWF World Tour, which was announced on 19 March 2017 and implemented in 2018, is a series of elite badminton tournaments sanctioned by the Badminton World Federation (BWF). The BWF World Tour is divided into levels of World Tour Finals, Super 1000, Super 750, Super 500, Super 300, and the BWF Tour Super 100.

Men's singles

BWF International Challenge/Series (6 titles, 3 runners-up) 
Men's singles

  BWF International Challenge tournament
  BWF International Series tournament

References

External links 
 

1999 births
Living people
Sportspeople from Taipei
Taiwanese male badminton players